Drosica is a genus of moths belonging to the family Tineidae. It was described by Francis Walker in 1863.

Species
Drosica abjectella Walker, 1863
Drosica memorialis Meyrick, 1921

References

Myrmecozelinae